Nea Filothei is a neighborhood of Athens, Greece. 

The area is named for St Filothei who was active in the area.

Neighbourhoods in Athens